Mahleb or Mahlepi is an aromatic spice made from the seeds of a species of cherry, Prunus mahaleb (the Mahaleb or St Lucie cherry). The cherry stones are cracked to extract the seed kernel, which is about 5 mm diameter, soft and chewy on extraction. The seed kernel is ground to a powder before use. Its flavour is similar to a combination of bitter almond and cherry, and similar also to marzipan.

Mahleb is used in small quantities to sharpen sweet foods and cakes, and is used in production of tresse cheese.

It has been used for centuries in the Middle East and the surrounding areas as a flavoring for baked goods. Recipes calling for the fruit or seed of the "ḫalub" date back to ancient Sumer. In recent decades, it has been slowly entering mainstream cookbooks in English.

In Greek cuisine, mahlep is sometimes added to different types of holiday tsoureki breads, including Christmas bread, the New Year's vasilopita and the braided Easter bread called cheoreg in Armenian and paskalya çöreği  in Turkish.

In Turkey, it is used in poğaça scones and other pastries. In the Arabic Middle East, it is used in ma'amoul scones. In Egypt, powdered mahlab is made into a paste with honey, sesame seeds and nuts, eaten as a dessert or a snack with bread.

In English, mahleb is sometimes alternately spelled as mahalab, mahlep, mahaleb, etc.

See also
 List of cherry dishes

References

Spices
Cherry dishes
Cypriot cuisine
Greek cuisine
Middle Eastern cuisine
Iranian cuisine
Arabic words and phrases
Turkish cuisine